The Venus' flower basket (Euplectella aspergillum) is a glass sponge in the phylum Porifera. It is a marine sponge found in the deep waters of the Pacific ocean, usually at depths below 500 meters. Like other sponges, they feed by filtering sea water to capture plankton and marine snow. Similar to other glass sponges, they build their skeletons out of silica, which forms a unique lattice structure of spicules. The sponges are usually between 10 cm and 30 cm tall, and their bodies act as refuge for their mutualist shrimp partners. This body structure is of great interest in materials science as the optical and mechanical properties are in some ways superior to man-made materials. Little is known regarding their reproduction habits, however fluid dynamics of their body structure likely influence reproduction and it is hypothesized that they may be hermaphroditic.

Habitat
Venus' flower baskets are found in the western Pacific Ocean nearby the Philippine Islands. Other species of this genus occur throughout oceans around the world, including near Japan and in the Indian Ocean.

This sponge's habitat is on the rocky areas of the benthic seafloor, where it lives and grows connected to hard substrate for its entire life. It can be found from 100 m to 1000 m (330 ft to 3300 ft) below the ocean's surface, and is most common at depths greater than 500 m. More specifically, they tend to anchor in soft sediments due to the nature of their spicules.

Connecting habitat to morphology, this sponge can often be found inhabiting loose, muddy sediments, causing them to develop a structure that would aid them in staying rooted to the sea floor.

Morphology

The body is tubular, curved and basket-like and made up of triaxon spicules. The body is perforated by numerous apertures, which are not true ostia but simply parietal gaps. Syconoid type of canal system is present, where ostia communicate with incurrent canals, which communicates with radial canals through prosopyles which, in turn, open into the spongocoel and to the outside through the osculum.

The body structure of these animals is a thin-walled, cylindrical, vase-shaped tube with a large central atrium. The body is composed entirely of silica in the form of 6-pointed siliceous spicules, which is why they are commonly known as glass sponges. The spicules are composed of three perpendicular rays, giving them six points. Spicules are microscopic, pin-like structures within the sponge's tissues that provide structural support for the sponge. It is the combination of spicule forms within a sponge's tissues that helps identify the species. In the case of glass sponges, the spicules "weave" together to form a very fine mesh, which gives the sponge's body a rigidity not found in other sponge species and allows glass sponges to survive at great depths in the water column.

It is speculated that the sponge harnesses bioluminescence to attract plankton. Its lattice shape also allows it to house animals like shrimp while remaining rooted in the ground.

Their peculiar skeletal motifs have been found to have important fluid-dynamic effects on both reducing the drag experienced by the sponge and in promoting coherent swirling motions inside the body cavity, arguably to promote selective filter feeding and sexual reproduction. In a study performed by Italian researcher, a three-dimensional model of Venus' Flower Basket was utilized to simulate the flow of water molecules in and out of its lattice. The researchers found that, while reducing the sponge's drag, it also created minute vortices inside the sponge which facilitated the mixing of its sperm and eggs; additionally, making feeding more efficient for the shrimp living inside of its lattice.

E. aspergillum differs in having anchorate basalia with six teeth, and diactins.

The skeleton of these sponges also contain silica nanoparticles among other biomaterials.

Reproduction 
As said in the introduction, little is known about reproduction. Sperm was found in one sample of E. aspergillum, within the connective tissue, and was described as aggregated clusters within very fine, thread-like appendages. This would contribute to the idea of the species being hermaphroditic. While these sponges are sessile, the sperm can be carried by the current and the ova that a different organism retained can be fertilized. It is also suggested that this species reproduces sexually, which can be deduced by the occurrence of their "internal recirculation patterns".

Mutualistic relationship 
The sponges are often found to house glass sponge shrimp, usually a breeding pair, who are typically unable to exit the sponge's lattice due to their size. Consequently, they live in and around these sponges, where the shrimp perform a mutualistic relationship with the sponge until they die. The shrimp live and mate in the shelter that the sponge provides, and in return they also clean the inside of the sponge. This may have influenced the adoption of the sponge as a symbol of undying love in Japan, where the skeletons of these sponges are presented as wedding gifts.

Ecology 
While there is not much known about the ecology of these sponges, more research has been done on its class, Hexactinellid sponges. Hexactinellids in the Pacific ocean form reefs on the sea floor many of which are extinct now, but thrived in the Jurassic period. The role they play ecologically can be connected to their feeding on plankton in the deep sea, which produces carbon within their environments. Besides this, they can house many animals that reside on the seafloor, including the shrimps mentioned in previous sections.

Ecosystem Role/Other Facts 
In a study done with various glass sponges, Venus' Flower Basket was noted to be difficult to extract any further information because of how inaccessible it serves to be. However, when in contact with alkali, these sponges showed a high resistance, which then lead researchers to believe that they potentially contain biomaterials like chitin, that could serve as a structural component to this species. This study suggests that as long as E. aspergillum and similar species are natural composites containing valuable biomaterials, they could be important in biomedicine and future biotechnology.

Anthropomorphic applications 

The glassy fibers that attach the sponge to the ocean floor, 5–20 centimetres (2–8 in) long and thin as human hair, are of interest to fiber optics researchers. The sponge extracts silicic acid from seawater and converts it into silica, then forms it into an elaborate skeleton of glass fibers. Other sponges such as the orange puffball sponge (Tethya aurantium) can also produce glass biologically. The current manufacturing process for optical fibers requires high temperatures and produces a brittle fiber. A low-temperature process for creating and arranging such fibers, inspired by sponges, could offer more control over the optical properties of the fibers. These nano-structures are also potentially useful for the creation of more efficient, low-cost solar cells. Furthermore, its skeletal structure has inspired a new type of structural lattice with a higher strength to weight ratio than other diagonally reinforced square lattices used in engineering applications.

These sponges skeletons have complex geometric configurations, which have been extensively studied for their stiffness, yield strength, and minimal crack propagation. An aluminum tube (aluminum and glass have similar elastic modulus) of equal length, effective thickness, and radius, but homogeneously distributed, has 1/100th the stiffness.

Besides these remarkable structural properties, Falcucci et al. found that their peculiar skeletal motifs deliver important fluid-dynamic effects on both reducing the drag experienced by the sponge and in promoting coherent swirling motions inside the body cavity, arguably to promote selective filter feeding and sexual reproduction.

Rao's work on biomimicry in architecture describes the architectural inspiration gleaned from the Venus' Flower Basket structure, notably in connection with Norman Foster's design for Gherkin tower in London.

References

External links
  The Venus' flower basket and skyscrapers YouTube.

Hexactinellida
Sponges described in 1841
Fiber optics
Glass production